Kenneth Paschal is an American politician from the state of Alabama. A member of the Republican Party, Paschal was elected to represent District 73 in the Alabama House of Representatives in a July 2021 special election. He is the first black Republican elected to the Alabama Legislature in almost 140 years, and the first to serve in the state legislature since W. P. Williams of Madison County served a two-year term from 1882 to 1884.

Career
Paschal served 21 years in the United States Army, retiring in 2006 as a first sergeant.

Paschal worked with the Alabama Family Rights Association. He also served on the Shelby County Republican Executive Committee and was a commander of the American Legion.

Paschal ran for state representative following Matt Fridy's resignation in order to join the Alabama Court of Civil Appeals. Among his other positions, Paschal campaigned against critical race theory. He won the special election on July 13, 2021, becoming the first black Republican elected to the Alabama Legislature since the Reconstruction era. Paschal was sworn in the following day.

Personal life
Paschal lives in Pelham, Alabama. He is a member of the First Baptist Church of Pelham.

References

External links
Campaign website

Living people
Republican Party members of the Alabama House of Representatives
21st-century American politicians
African-American state legislators in Alabama
United States Army non-commissioned officers
African-American United States Army personnel
African-American Christians
Black conservatism in the United States
21st-century African-American politicians
1966 births